Community Magazine is a Brooklyn-published monthly magazine whose addressed communities are plural: Brooklyn's large Sephardic population, that of Deal, NJ and also Orthodox Ashkenaz readers. Until 2001 its name was Aram Soba newsletter.

Overview
Other Jewish periodicals cite their information as a source.

A list of Jewish periodicals covering USA, UK, Israel and other Jewish population centers, in English, Hebrew, Yiddish, French and other languages: calls it "the most widely circulated Sephardic monthly magazine in the world."

Less than a month before a very close election, The New York Observer described coverage by Community as "they went nuclear."

Features
A multi-page Torah article by Eli Mansour appears monthly. There are other ongoing Halacha items and articles about Jewish History, and understanding science as it interacts with Halacha.

References

External links
 Website

Jewish magazines published in the United States
Local interest magazines published in the United States
Magazines published in New York City
Monthly magazines published in the United States
Magazines with year of establishment missing
Newsletters